LST 1590-4 is a character encoding used to write the Lithuanian language. It is a modification of Windows-1257 to support additional accented letters and phonetic notation.

Codepage layout
The following table shows LST 1590-4. Each character is shown with its equivalent Unicode code point. Only the second half of the table (code points 128–255) is shown, the first half (code points 0–127) being the same as ASCII.

References

Character sets
Lithuanian language